A scorpion is a predatory arthropod animal.

Scorpion may also refer to:

Computing and technology
 Scorpion (computer), a Russian ZX Spectrum clone computer
 Scorpion (CPU), a Qualcomm CPU used in smart phones

Film and television
 Scorpion (2007 film), a French film
 Scorpion (2018 film), an Uzbek film
 Scorpion (TV series), an American drama series broadcast on CBS from 2014 to 2018
 "Scorpion" (Star Trek: Voyager), a 1997 episode of Star Trek: Voyager

Gaming
 Scorpion (solitaire), a card game
 Scorpion (video game), a 1989 video game
 Scorpion: Disfigured, a 2009 German computer game
 Scorpion (Mortal Kombat), a video game character
 Scorpion, a wrestler in the video game Saturday Night Slam Masters

Literature
 Scorpion (publishing house), an early-1900s Russian book publisher
The Scorpion, a title used for one issue in 1939 by the pulp magazine The Western Raider
 The Scorpion (novel), a 1982 novel by Zayd Mutee' Dammaj
 Scorpion (novel), a 1985 spy thriller by Andrew Kaplan
 Scorpions (novel), a 1988 novel by Walter Dean Myers

Comics
 Scorpion (Mac Gargan), a character in Spider-Man
 Scorpion (Carmilla Black), a character in Marvel Comics
 Scorpion (Atlas/Seaboard Comics) by Stephen Desberg and Enrico Marini
 Other characters in the list of Marvel Comics characters

Music
 Scorpions (band), a German hard rock band
 The Scorpions, a 1976 re-issue of their 1972 debut album Lonesome Crow
 The Scorpions (Manchester band), a British beat group
 The Scorpions, an English rock band later renamed Status Quo
 The Scorpion (album), an album by Lou Donaldson
 Scorpion (Drake album), a 2018 double album
 Scorpion (Eve album) (2001)
 "The Scorpion", a song by Megadeth from The System Has Failed

People
 Scorpion I, Egyptian pharaoh
 Scorpion II, Egyptian pharaoh

Military/paramilitary

Combat units
 Scorpions (Iraq), a paramilitary Iraqi force organized by the CIA
 Scorpions (paramilitary), a paramilitary group involved in the 1995 Srebrenica massacre
 Scorpions (South Africa), a multidisciplinary agency that investigated and prosecuted organised crime and corruption 
 VAQ-132 or the Scorpions, a U.S. Navy aircraft squadron

Vessels
 CSS Scorpion, a Confederate Navy boat
 HMS Scorpion (1746), a 14-gun Merlin-class sloop
 HMS Scorpion (1794), a gunvessel
 HMS Scorpion (1803), a Cruizer-class brig-sloop
 HMS Scorpion (1863), a turret ship
 HMS Scorpion (1910), a Beagle-class destroyer
 HMS Scorpion (G72), an S-class destroyer launched in 1942
 HMS Scorpion (D64), a Weapon-class destroyer launched in 1946
 Soviet submarine B-427 or Scorpion, a decommissioned Soviet submarine
 USS Scorpion (1812), a block sloop
 USS Scorpion (1813), a schooner
 USS Scorpion (1847), a bark-rigged steamer
 USS Scorpion (PY-3), a patrol yacht and gunboat commissioned in 1898
 USS Scorpion (SS-278), a Gato-class submarine commissioned in 1942
 USS Scorpion (SSN-589), a Skipjack-class nuclear-powered submarine commissioned in 1960

Other military
 CZ Scorpion Evo 3, 9mm semi-automatic or select-fire carbine made in the Czech Republic
 Škorpion, submachine gun made in Czechoslovakia
 FV101 Scorpion, British light tank
 M56 Scorpion, unarmored American self-propelled anti-tank gun
 Northrop F-89 Scorpion, American jet fighter
 Rotem KW1 Scorpion, South Korean wheeled armored personal carrier
 Textron AirLand Scorpion, American light attack jet aircraft proposed for export

Sports
 Scorpion (horse), Irish Thoroughbred racehorse and sire
 Scorpion kick, a footballing move
 Sharpshooter (professional wrestling) or scorpion hold, a professional wrestling hold
 Scorpion, a shot used in pickleball

Team/club names
 Scorpion aerobatic team, aerobatic demonstration team of the aviation arm of the Polish Land Forces
 Scorpions RFC, rugby club in East Africa
 Hannover Scorpions, German ice hockey team
 Logan Scorpions, Australian rugby league football club
 New Mexico Scorpions, American hockey team
 San Antonio Scorpions, American soccer club
 Scottsdale Scorpions, American professional baseball team
 South Wales Scorpions, Welsh rugby league football club
 Stuttgart Scorpions, German American football team
 Yuma Desert Rats or Yuma Scorpions, defunct baseball team that played in various independent minor leagues
 Saint-Juéry XIII or the Scorpions, French rugby league football club
 The Scorpions, a professional wrestling tag-team from the United States Wrestling Association

Transportation
 Scorpion (dinghy), a class of small sailing dinghy
 Grinnall Scorpion III, a three-wheeled roadster
 Grinnall Scorpion IV, a four-wheeled roadster
 Mitsubishi Scorpion, an automobile made by Mitsubishi Motors
 Ronn Motor Scorpion, an automobile
 RotorWay Scorpion, a line of helicopters
 SC Scorpion, a Ukrainian paraglider design

Weaponry
 Scorpio (weapon), an ancient Greco-Roman catapult
 Scourge, a whipping device, also called a scorpion
 Škorpion vz. 61, a Czech submachine gun
 CZ Scorpion Evo 3, a Czech submachine gun
 Scorpion silent pistol

Other uses
 Scorpion (roller coaster)
 Scorpion Prison

See also
 
 Scorpia, fictional character in the animated television series She-Ra: Princess of Power and She-Ra and the Princesses of Power
 Scorpio (disambiguation)
 Scorpion (comics), a list of comics
 The Scorpion and the Frog, an animal fable
 Scorpion man, an Akkadian mythological figure
 Scorpius (disambiguation)
 Scorponok, several fictional characters in the various Transformers universes
 Skorpion (disambiguation)
 Water scorpion, an insect